Yevgeni Viktorovich Koganov (born 29 August 1976) is a former Russian football player.

Club career
He made his Russian Premier League debut for FC Zenit Saint Petersburg on 30 March 1996 in a game against FC Dynamo Moscow. That was his only season in the RPL.

External links
 

1976 births
Living people
Russian footballers
FC Zenit Saint Petersburg players
Russian Premier League players
FC Arsenal Tula players
FC Akhmat Grozny players
FC Salyut Belgorod players
FC Kristall Smolensk players
Association football defenders
FC Neftyanik Ufa players
FC Zenit-2 Saint Petersburg players